Kikeout Mountain is a summit in Kinnelon borough, Morris County, New Jersey, in the United States.

The name Kikeout derives from the Dutch word kijkuit, meaning "lookout". "Kakeout" is the local pronunciation of the name of the mountain and adjacent reservoir, but the spelling has caused a degree of local controversy due to its similarity to the word kike, an ethnic slur referring to Jews.

References

Mountains of Morris County, New Jersey
Mountains of New Jersey
Naming controversies
Jews and Judaism in New Jersey